Neolitsea sericea is a species of tree in the family Lauraceae. It is found in China, Taiwan (Orchid Island, Green Island), south Korea, and Japan. Its natural habitat is on forest margins and slopes, and it is often found in well-progressed secondary forests.

Its leaves are evergreen, and distinctly whitened on the back. It produces yellow flowers in the fall, and its fruit is a red berry.

Neolitsea sericea contains two varieties, Neolitsea sericea var. sericea and Neolitsea sericea var. aurata. The latter may also be considered as its own species, Neolitsea aurata.

References

Further reading
Chung, Myong Gi, et al. "Spatial genetic structure in a Neolitsea sericea population (Lauraceae)." Heredity 85.5 (2000): 490–497.

sericea
Trees of China
Trees of Japan
Trees of Korea
Trees of Taiwan